Odo of Vitry (Eudes) (died 1158) was a French nobleman.  Count of Rethel and Châtelain de Vitry.  His parenthood is unclear.  It is sometimes stated that he was a son of André, castellan of Vitré and of Agnès de Mortain, but this appears to be based on a confusion between Vitré in Brittany and Vitry in Champagne. On the death of his brother-in-law, Gervase, he received the county of Rethel.

Odo was married to Matilda (d. 1151), the eldest daughter of Hugh I, Count of Rethel.  They had at least four children:
 Guitier of Rethel
 Unnamed daughter who married Etienne Strabo de Neufchâtel-sur Aisne
 Unnamed daughter who married a lord of Henalmont
 Yvette, who married first a Milo and second Villian d'Arzillières.

From 1124 until his wife's death in 1151, he ruled Rethel jointly with her.  After her death, he ruled alone.  Odo died in 1158, and was succeeded by his son Guitier.

References

Sources

Counts of Rethel
Year of birth unknown
1158 deaths
People from Rethel
12th-century French people